Forever is a 2003 Italian romantic drama film written and directed by Alessandro Di Robilant.

Cast 

 Giancarlo Giannini as Giovanni
 Francesca Neri as Sara
 Emilio Solfrizzi as Doddoli
 Elisabetta Pellini as Sabrina 
 Alberto Di Stasio as  Caizzi 
 Sabina Vannucchi as Giovanni's wife

References

External links

2003 films
Italian romantic drama films
2003 romantic drama films
2000s Italian-language films
2000s Italian films